Drum Club was a 1990s electronic music duo of former promoters and DJs Charlie Hall and Lol Hammond.  They released several albums and singles on record labels such as Big Life and Butterfly Records.  Their 1993 single "Sound System" reached #63 on the UK Singles Chart.  They have remixed artists such as Psychick Warriors Ov Gaia, Chapterhouse, Killing Joke, Transglobal Underground & Invaders Of The Heart and have been remixed by artists including Hardkiss, Underworld, Youth & Orbital.

Selected discography

Albums
1993: Everything is Now (Butterfly/Big Life)
1994: Drums Are Dangerous (Butterfly, Instinct Records)
1995: Live in Iceland (Sabrettes, Instinct Records)

Singles
1992: "U Make Me Feel So Good" (Guerilla Records)
1993: "Alchemy" (Guerilla Records)
1993: "Sound System" (Butterfly Records)
1994: "Drums Are Dangerous"' (Butterfly Records)
1997: "You Make Me Feel So Good" (Jackpot)

Remixes
1994: Psychic TV - "Tribal"

References

External links

British electronic music groups
Instinct Records artists